The  AFL Yarra Ranges was an Australian rules football and netball organisation based in the Yarra Valley and Dandenong Ranges within Victoria. The organisation operated the Yarra Ranges Senior Football league and the Yarra Ranges Junior Football league.

History
The Yarra Valley Mountain District Football League was formed in 1966, from the amalgamation of the Mountain District Football League and the Yarra Valley Football Association (1907–1954).

South Belgrave transferred to the Eastern Football League for the 2008 season, followed by Silvan for the 2011 season.  Thornton-Eildon Football Club went into recess at the start of 2011.

Most of the teams in the league are based in the outer fringes of north-east and east Melbourne. However, the addition in recent years of Thornton-Eildon, Yea and Alexandra from the Kyabram District Football League has seen the league expand into the Goulburn Valley area of central Victoria.

In 2016, following a review, the league decided to change its name to the AFL Yarra Ranges. At the conclusion of the 2018 season, the league merged with the South East Football Netball League to form the Outer East Football Netball League.

Structure
Clubs fielded football teams in seniors, reserves and under-18s. Clubs played in a two division structure in both the seniors and reserves, with the club winning the senior flag in division two promoted and the bottom division one senior club relegated each season. Since 2013, the under-18s has been played as a single division. A netball competition was introduced in 2005, with the competition subsequently expanded to cater for A, B and C grades.

Clubs - Division One

Clubs - Division Two

Previous Clubs
Boronia Park (folded)
Fair Park (renamed Eastern Lions, transferred to Eastern Football League)
Marysville (folded)
Millgrove - merged with Warburton in 1967
Warburton - merged with Millgrove in 1967
Panton Hill (transferred to Northern Football League)
Silvan Football (transferred to Eastern Football League)
South Belgrave (transferred to Eastern Football League)
Worawa (folded)

Premierships

Division 1

Division 2

a Under 18s won as Thornton

References

External links
 Full Points Footy -Yarra Valley Mountain Football League
League Official Website
Local Football League Fan Web Site

1966 establishments in Australia
Sports leagues established in 1966
Defunct Australian rules football competitions in Victoria (Australia)
Yarra Valley
Defunct netball leagues in Australia
Netball leagues in Victoria (Australia)